Nieuwe Haven is a Royal Netherlands Navy base in Den Helder and the largest naval base in the Netherlands.

History
Already before World War I, Willemsoord had become too small for major warships. In the 1920s the light cruiser Java of  could not visit the wet dock. After World War II, the Dutch government established a commission to find a site for a new naval base. It was given a choice between IJmuiden, Rotterdam, Vlissingen or Den Helder. In 1947 it was decided Den Helder would become the Netherlands' main naval base. A definitive plan for the new harbor was completed in 1948 and estimated its cost at 29 million florins.

For the construction of the new harbor an area east of the Nieuwediep was selected. Construction started in 1949 when the mouth of the Nieuwediep was dammed off. Reclaimed land was used to built the base. The rest of the base was completed in 1958.

Since the move of the submarine service from Rotterdam to the Nieuwe Haven, all naval vessels have Den Helder as their home port.

References

Installations of the Royal Netherlands Navy
Ports and harbours of the Netherlands
Den Helder